The Government of Bagmati Province, known locally as the Province Government, is the supreme governing authority of the Nepalese province of Bagmati Province which consists of 13 districts.

The Governor of the province is appointed head of the province by the President of Nepal on the recommendation of Federal cabinet for a period of five years unless freed earlier by federal government. The Head of Bagmati Province is the Governor (Provincial Chief)and the Chief Minister holds the position of the Head of executive. The role of governor is largely ceremonial as the functioning of the government is managed entirely by the Chief Minister. The governor appoints minister and chief minister based on the articles and clauses of Constitution.

The province government maintains its capital at Hetauda and is seated at the Bagmati Province Provincial Government Secretariat.

Etymology
Bagmati is named after the Bagmati River which runs through the Kathmandu valley. The river is considered the source of the Newar civilization and urbanization. The river has been mentioned as Vaggumuda in Vinaya Pitaka and Nandabagga. It has also been mentioned as Bahumati in Battha Suttanta of Majjhima Nikaya. An inscription dated 477 A.D. describes the river as Bagvati Parpradeshe and subsequently in the Gopalraj Vanshavali.

A provincial assembly meeting on 12 January 2020 endorsed the proposal to name the province as Bagmati by a majority vote.  Hetauda was declared as the permanent state capital on January 12, 2020.

Executive

Head of State 

The Governors of the Province of Nepal have similar powers and functions at the  province (state) level as those of the President of Nepal at National level. According to the Constitution of Nepal, the Governor is a state's head, but de facto executive authority rests with the chief minister. The governor acts as the nominal head whereas the real power lies with the Chief ministers of the province and his/her councils of ministers. The Governor of a Province is appointed by the President of Nepal. The incumbent Governor of Bagmati Province is Yadav Chandra Sharma since 20 August 2021.

Head of Goverment 

In the Federal Democratic Republic of Nepal, a chief minister is the elected head of government of the each seven province . Following elections to the Bagmati Provincial Assembly, the governor usually invites the party (or coalition) with a majority of seats to form the government. The governor appoints the chief minister, whose council of ministers are collectively responsible to the assembly. Given that he has the confidence of the assembly, the chief minister's term is for five years and is subject to no term limits.The current chief minister is Shalikram Jamkattel who is having incumbency since 10 January 2023.

Secretary

The Chief Secretary of Bagmati Province (Nepali: बागमती प्रदेशको मुख्य सचिव) is the chief administrative officer and senior–most civil servant of the Government of Bagmati Province. The chief secretary is the head of the Cabinet Secretariat and is the secretary of the cabinet and the constitutional council. The Cabinet Secretary enforces cabinet discipline and coordinates between ministries. Current Chief secretary of Nepal is (Mukund Prasad Niraula ).

Legislature

Officers 

 Speaker of the Bagmati Provincial Assembly : Bhuwan Kumar Pathak

Bagmati Provincial Assembly

The Bagmati Provincial Assembly also known as the Bagmati Pradesh Sabha. The legislative structure of the province is unicameral. The Bagmati Provincial Assembly consists of 110 members of whom 66 are elected through first-past-the-post voting and 44 of whom are elected through proportional representation. The term of the assembly is five years unless dissolved earlier.

Judiciary 

 Chief Justice of Patan High Court: Vacant

Notes

References

External links
 

Government of Bagmati Province
Bagmati Province